Las Amazonas is a Venezuelan telenovela written by César Miguel Rondón and produced by Venevisión in 1985. This series lasted for 105 episodes and was distributed internationally by Venevisión International.

Hilda Carrero and Eduardo Serrano starred as the main protagonists with Miriam Ochoa as the antagonist.

Synopsis
Emiro Lizárraga is an ambitious, proud owner of a horse ranch called Amazonas. Emiro obtained his fortune through illegal means, and he has three daughters Isabel, Carolina and Eloísa while also having recently married his secretary Elvira, a flirtatious, calculating and ambitious woman. The girls do not get along well with their father's new wife, leading to conflicts. Isabel, the eldest daughter, becomes attracted to Rodrigo, a young veterinarian who is divorced and has two daughters. Carolina has a sweet, docile nature while the last of the girls, Eloísa, who has recently graduated from a school in the United States, is the most liberal of them all. At the ranch, she falls in love with Dario who dreams of becoming a jockey. These three girls have been raised up by Ines, and she supports them against their father's plans of marrying them off in convenient marriages. But the girls will not follow their father’s wishes, and find their own happiness on their own terms.

Cast

Hilda Carrero as Isabel Lizárraga Aranguren
Eduardo Serrano as Rodrigo Izaguirre Campos
Alba Roversi as Eloísa Lizárraga Aranguren
Corina Azopardo as Carolina Lizárraga Aranguren
Miriam Ochoa as Elvira Castillas De Lizárraga
Manuel Escolano as Carmelo Fábrega
Tony Rodriguez as Darío Landa
Santy as Fernando
Eva Blanco as Inés Landa
Julio Alcázar as Francisco Urdaneta
José Oliva as Emiro Lizárraga Sorté
Fernando Flores as Pascual Torres Mendoza
Pedro Marthán as Oscar Alvarado
Reneé de Pallás as Doña Delia
Betty Ruth as Ramona
 Laura Termini Lalita Izaguirre
Chela D'Gar as Trina
Esther Orjuela as Esperanza Moreno
Angélica Arenas as Jeanette Ibarra
Juan Manuel Montesinos as Raúl Moretti
Flor Núñez as Consuelo
Henry Galué as Inspector Lander
Gerardo Marrero as Dimas Peña
Jeannette Lehr as Ágatha
Emilia Rojas as Irama
Chumico Romero as Antonio
Luis A. Romero as Nap
Ernesto Balzi as Roberto
Mariela Capriles as Amelia
Jose L. Vargas as Varguitas
Alexandra Rodríguez as Jimena
Hermelinda Alvarado as Sra. Cheragusia
German Regalado as Veloz

References

External links

1985 telenovelas
Venevisión telenovelas
1985 Venezuelan television series debuts
1985 Venezuelan television series endings
Venezuelan telenovelas
Spanish-language telenovelas
Television shows set in Venezuela